Bash-n-the-Code, later known as just Bash, was a musical derivative of the band Found Free, a 1970s mellow pop rock unit. The band was founded by Keith Lancaster in 1971, who was heavily involved with the group from its beginnings to its end. With sights set on the teen market, Bash-n-the-Code's albums featured dance-pop music, and their concerts were heavy on theatrics. Their first two albums feature husband-and-wife duo, Greg Sparks and Rebecca Sparks. John Fett and Jamie Kearney provided the lead vocals on More than Enough, while James Burks provided the lead vocals on the fourth and final album.

Mark Townsend often used a ferrari red Jackson soloist, with a burst Gibson Les Paul as a backup, and a Marshall amplifier.

Discography 
Bash-n-the-Code (1986)
Big Mouth (1987)
More Than Enough (1989)
Holiday (1991)

References

External links 
Christian Music Archive: Bash-N-The-Code Retrieved November 5, 2007.
 Answers.com: Greg and Rebecca Sparks Retrieved November 5, 2007.
Facebook Bash'n'the Code Official Facebook Page Retrieved, March 2016.

American Christian musical groups
Performers of contemporary Christian music
Musical groups established in 1971